Samuel Koejoe (born 17 August 1974 in Paramaribo, Suriname) is a Dutch former professional footballer who played as a striker.

A pacy striker, Koejoe played much of his career in Austria and Germany, and played also for Queens Park Rangers.

He was the leading scorer for DAC Dunajská Streda in the 2009–10 season.

References

1974 births
Living people
Surinamese emigrants to the Netherlands
Sportspeople from Paramaribo
Dutch footballers
Association football forwards
AFC DWS players
SC Austria Lustenau players
FC Red Bull Salzburg players
FC Wacker Innsbruck (2002) players
Queens Park Rangers F.C. players
SC Freiburg players
Eintracht Braunschweig players
Dynamo Dresden players
FSV Frankfurt players
Austrian Football Bundesliga players
Bundesliga players
2. Bundesliga players
FC DAC 1904 Dunajská Streda players
Slovak Super Liga players
Dutch expatriate sportspeople in Germany
Expatriate footballers in Germany
Dutch expatriate sportspeople in Austria
Expatriate footballers in Austria
Dutch expatriate sportspeople in Slovakia
Expatriate footballers in Slovakia
Dutch expatriate sportspeople in England
Expatriate footballers in England